Football, for the 2013 Bolivarian Games, took place from 17 November to 25 November 2013. Here, the men's tournament is for the under-18 footballers. The women's tournament is for the under-20 footballers.

Medal table

Events

Men's U18 tournament

Women's U20 tournament

References

Football
2013
2013 in South American football
2013 in Peruvian football
2013
2013 in women's association football